Boys in Black were a five-piece vocal group formed in New Zealand, which included three brothers Ben, Bob and Paul Bob. Their cover version of Bee Gees' song, "More Than a Woman" (1993), reached the top 50 on both New Zealand and Australian singles charts. All members had a Polynesian background. They performed the track on Australian TV's The Midday Show in April 1993. Their final single, "It's Alright", appeared in 1998.

Members

 Bob Bob – vocals
 Ben Bob – vocals
 Paul Bob – vocals
 Jason Williams – vocals
 DJ Sunny – vocals
 Joseph Faaoloii – vocals (replaced Sunny)

Discography

Singles

References

New South Wales musical groups
Living people
Year of birth missing (living people)